

Events

Pre-1600
 293 – Roman Emperors Diocletian and Maximian appoint Galerius as Caesar to Diocletian, beginning the period of four rulers known as the Tetrarchy.
 878 – Syracuse, Sicily, is captured by the Muslim Aghlabids after a nine-month siege.
 879 – Pope John VIII gives blessings to Branimir of Croatia and to the Croatian people, considered to be international recognition of the Croatian state.
 996 – Sixteen-year-old Otto III is crowned Holy Roman Emperor.
1349 – Dušan's Code, the constitution of the Serbian Empire, is enacted by Dušan the Mighty.
1403 – Henry III of Castile sends Ruy González de Clavijo as ambassador to Timur to discuss the possibility of an alliance between Timur and Castile against the Ottoman Empire.
1554 – Queen Mary I grants a royal charter to Derby School, as a grammar school for boys in Derby, England.

1601–1900
1659 – In the Concert of The Hague, the Dutch Republic, the Commonwealth of England and the Kingdom of France set out their views on how the Second Northern War should end.
1660 – The Battle of Long Sault concludes after five days in which French colonial militia, with their Huron and Algonquin allies, are defeated by the Iroquois Confederacy.
1674 – The nobility elect John Sobieski King of Poland and Grand Duke of Lithuania.
1703 – Daniel Defoe is imprisoned on charges of seditious libel.
1725 – The Order of St. Alexander Nevsky is instituted in Russia by Empress Catherine I. It would later be discontinued and then reinstated by the Soviet government in 1942 as the Order of Alexander Nevsky.
1758 – Ten-year-old Mary Campbell is abducted in Pennsylvania by Lenape during the French and Indian War. She is returned six and a half years later.
1792 – A lava dome collapses on Mount Unzen, near the city of Shimbara on the Japanese island of Kyūshū, creating a deadly tsunami that killed nearly 15,000 people.
1809 – The first day of the Battle of Aspern-Essling between the Austrian army led by Archduke Charles and the French army led by Napoleon I of France sees the French attack across the Danube held.
1851 – Slavery in Colombia is abolished.
1856 – Lawrence, Kansas is captured and burned by pro-slavery forces.
1863 – American Civil War: The Union Army succeeds in closing off the last escape route from Port Hudson, Louisiana, in preparation for the coming siege.
1864 – Russia declares an end to the Russo-Circassian War and many Circassians are forced into exile. The day is designated the Circassian Day of Mourning.
  1864   – American Civil War: The Battle of Spotsylvania Court House ends.
  1864   – The Ionian Islands reunite with Greece.
1871 – French troops invade the Paris Commune and engage its residents in street fighting. By the close of "Bloody Week", some 20,000 communards have been killed and 38,000 arrested.
  1871   – Opening of the first rack railway in Europe, the Rigi Bahnen on Mount Rigi.
1879 – War of the Pacific: Two Chilean ships blocking the harbor of Iquique (then belonging to Peru) battle two Peruvian vessels in the Battle of Iquique.
1881 – The American Red Cross is established by Clara Barton in Washington, D.C.
1894 – The Manchester Ship Canal in the United Kingdom is officially opened by Queen Victoria, who later knights its designer Sir Edward Leader Williams.

1901–present
1904 – The Fédération Internationale de Football Association (FIFA) is founded in Paris.
1911 – President of Mexico Porfirio Díaz and the revolutionary Francisco Madero sign the Treaty of Ciudad Juárez to put an end to the fighting between the forces of both men, concluding the initial phase of the Mexican Revolution.
1917 – The Imperial War Graves Commission is established through royal charter to mark, record, and maintain the graves and places of commemoration of the British Empire's military forces.
  1917   – The Great Atlanta fire of 1917 causes $5.5 million in damages, destroying some 300 acres including 2,000 homes, businesses and churches, displacing about 10,000 people but leading to only one fatality (due to heart attack).
1924 – University of Chicago students Richard Loeb and Nathan Leopold, Jr. murder 14-year-old Bobby Franks in a "thrill killing".
1927 – Charles Lindbergh touches down at Le Bourget Field in Paris, completing the world's first solo nonstop flight across the Atlantic Ocean.
1932 – Bad weather forces Amelia Earhart to land in a pasture in Derry, Northern Ireland, and she thereby becomes the first woman to fly solo across the Atlantic Ocean.
1934 – Oskaloosa, Iowa, becomes the first municipality in the United States to fingerprint all of its citizens.
1936 – Sada Abe is arrested after wandering the streets of Tokyo for days with her dead lover's severed genitals in her handbag. Her story soon becomes one of Japan's most notorious scandals.
1937 – A Soviet station, North Pole-1, becomes the first scientific research settlement to operate on the drift ice of the Arctic Ocean.
1939 – The Canadian National War Memorial is unveiled by King George VI and Queen Elizabeth in Ottawa, Ontario, Canada.
1946 – Physicist Louis Slotin is fatally irradiated in a criticality incident during an experiment with the demon core at Los Alamos National Laboratory.
1951 – The opening of the Ninth Street Show, otherwise known as the 9th Street Art Exhibition: A gathering of a number of notable artists, and the stepping-out of the post war New York avant-garde, collectively known as the New York School.
1961 – American civil rights movement: Alabama Governor John Malcolm Patterson declares martial law in an attempt to restore order after race riots break out.
1966 – The Ulster Volunteer Force declares war on the Irish Republican Army in Northern Ireland.
1969 – Civil unrest in Rosario, Argentina, known as Rosariazo, following the death of a 15-year-old student.
1972 – Michelangelo's Pietà in St. Peter's Basilica in Rome is damaged by a vandal, the mentally disturbed Hungarian geologist Laszlo Toth.
1976 – Twenty-nine people are killed in the Yuba City bus disaster in Martinez, California.
1979 – White Night riots in San Francisco following the manslaughter conviction of Dan White for the assassinations of George Moscone and Harvey Milk.
1981 – The Italian government releases the membership list of Propaganda Due, an illegal pseudo-Masonic lodge that was implicated in numerous Italian crimes and mysteries.
  1981   – Transamerica Corporation agrees to sell United Artists to Metro-Goldwyn-Mayer for $380 million after the box office failure of the 1980 film Heaven's Gate.
1982 – Falklands War: A British amphibious assault during Operation Sutton leads to the Battle of San Carlos.
1988 – Margaret Thatcher holds her controversial Sermon on the Mound before the General Assembly of the Church of Scotland.
1991 – Former Indian Prime Minister Rajiv Gandhi is assassinated by a female suicide bomber near Madras.
  1991   – Mengistu Haile Mariam, president of the People's Democratic Republic of Ethiopia, flees Ethiopia, effectively bringing the Ethiopian Civil War to an end.
1992 – After 30 seasons Johnny Carson hosted his penultimate episode and last featuring guests (Robin Williams and Bette Midler) of The Tonight Show.
1994 – The Democratic Republic of Yemen unsuccessfully attempts to secede from the Republic of Yemen; a war breaks out.
1996 – The ferry  sinks in Tanzanian waters on Lake Victoria, killing nearly 1,000.
1998 – In Miami, five abortion clinics are attacked by a butyric acid attacker.
  1998   – President Suharto of Indonesia resigns following the killing of students from Trisakti University earlier that week by security forces and growing mass protests in Jakarta against his ongoing corrupt rule. 
2000 – Nineteen people are killed in a plane crash in Wilkes-Barre, Pennsylvania. 
2001 – French Taubira law is enacted, officially recognizing the Atlantic slave trade and slavery as crimes against humanity.
2003 – The 6.8  Boumerdès earthquake shakes northern Algeria with a maximum Mercalli intensity of X (Extreme). More than 2,200 people were killed and a moderate tsunami sank boats at the Balearic Islands.
2005 – The tallest roller coaster in the world, Kingda Ka opens at Six Flags Great Adventure in Jackson Township, New Jersey.
2006 – The Republic of Montenegro holds a referendum proposing independence from the State Union of Serbia and Montenegro; 55% of Montenegrins vote for independence.
2010 – JAXA, the Japan Aerospace Exploration Agency, launches the solar-sail spacecraft IKAROS aboard an H-IIA rocket. The vessel would make a Venus flyby late in the year.
2011 – Radio broadcaster Harold Camping predicted that the world would end on this date. 
2012 – A bus accident near Himara, Albania kills 13 people and injures 21 others.
  2012   – A suicide bombing kills more than 120 people in Sana'a, Yemen.
2014 – Random killings occurred on the Bannan Line of the Taipei MRT, killing four and injuring 24.
2017 – Ringling Bros. and Barnum & Bailey Circus performed their final show at Nassau Veterans Memorial Coliseum.

Births

Pre-1600
1471 – Albrecht Dürer, German painter, engraver, and mathematician (d. 1528)
1497 – Al-Hattab, Muslim jurist (d. 1547)
1527 – Philip II of Spain (d. 1598)

1601–1900
1653 – Eleonore of Austria, Queen of Poland (d. 1697)
1688 – (O.S.) Alexander Pope, English poet, essayist, and translator (d. 1744)
1755 – Alfred Moore, American lawyer and judge (d. 1810)
1756 – William Babington, Irish-born, English physician and mineralogist (d. 1833)
1759 – Joseph Fouché, French lawyer and politician (d. 1820)
1775 – Lucien Bonaparte, French soldier and politician (d. 1840)
1780 – Elizabeth Fry, English prison reformer, philanthropist and Quaker (d. 1845)
1790 – William Cavendish, 6th Duke of Devonshire, English politician, Lord Chamberlain of the Household (d. 1858)
1792 – Gaspard-Gustave de Coriolis, French mathematician and engineer (d. 1843)
1799 – Mary Anning, English paleontologist (d. 1847)
1801 – Princess Sophie of Sweden, Swedish princess (d. 1865)
1806 – Harriet Sutherland-Leveson-Gower, Duchess of Sutherland, English duchess (d. 1868)
1808 – David de Jahacob Lopez Cardozo, Dutch Talmudist (d. 1890)
1827 – William P. Sprague, American banker and politician (d. 1899)
1828 – Rudolf Koller, Swiss painter (d. 1905)
1835 – František Chvostek, Czech-Austrian physician and academic (d. 1884)
1837 – Itagaki Taisuke, Japanese soldier and politician (d. 1919)
1843 – Charles Albert Gobat, Swiss lawyer and politician, and Nobel Prize laureate (d. 1914)
  1843   – Louis Renault, French jurist, educator, and Nobel Prize laureate (d. 1918)
1844 – Henri Rousseau, French painter (d. 1910)
1850 – Giuseppe Mercalli, Italian priest and volcanologist (d. 1914)
1851 – Léon Bourgeois, French police officer and politician, 64th Prime Minister of France, Nobel Prize laureate (d. 1925)
1853 – Jacques Marie Eugène Godefroy Cavaignac, French politician (d. 1905)
1855 – Ella Stewart Udall, American telegraphist (d. 1937)
1856 – José Batlle y Ordóñez, Uruguayan journalist and politician, President of Uruguay (d. 1929)
1858 – Édouard Goursat, French mathematician (d. 1936)
1860 – Willem Einthoven, Indonesian-Dutch  physician, physiologist, and academic, Nobel Prize laureate (d. 1927)
1861 – Abel Ayerza, Argentinian physician and academic (d. 1918)
1863 – Archduke Eugen of Austria (d. 1954)
1864 – Princess Stéphanie of Belgium (d. 1945)
1867 – Anne Walter Fearn, American physician (d. 1939)
1873 – Hans Berger, German neurologist and academic (d. 1941)
1878 – Glenn Curtiss, American cyclist and engineer (d. 1930)
1880 – Tudor Arghezi, Romanian journalist, author, and poet (d. 1967)
1884 – Manuel Pérez y Curis, Uruguayan poet and publisher (d. 1920)
1885 – Princess Sophie of Albania, (Princess Sophie of Schönburg-Waldenburg) (d. 1936)
1893 – Arthur Carr, English cricketer (d. 1963)
  1893   – Giles Chippindall, Australian public servant (d. 1969)
1895 – Lázaro Cárdenas, Mexican general, president (1934–1940) and father of Cuauhtémoc Cárdenas (d. 1970) 
1898 – Armand Hammer, American physician and businessman, founded Occidental Petroleum (d. 1990)
  1898   – Charles Léon Hammes, Luxembourgian lawyer and judge (d. 1967)
  1898   – Carl Johnson, American long jumper (d. 1932)
  1898   – John McLaughlin, American painter and translator (d. 1976)

1901–present
1901 – Regina M. Anderson, Multiracial playwright and librarian (d. 1993)
  1901   – Horace Heidt, American pianist, bandleader, and radio host (d. 1986)
  1901   – Sam Jaffe, American film producer and agent (d. 2000)
  1901   – Suzanne Lilar, Belgian author and playwright (d. 1992)
1902 – Earl Averill, American baseball player (d. 1983)
  1902   – Marcel Breuer, Hungarian-American architect and academic, designed the Ameritrust Tower (d. 1981)
  1902   – Anatole Litvak, Ukrainian-American director, producer, and screenwriter (d. 1974)
1903 – Manly Wade Wellman, American author (d. 1986)
1904 – Robert Montgomery, American actor and director (d. 1981)
  1904   – Fats Waller, American singer-songwriter and pianist (d. 1943)
1907 – John C. Allen, American roller coaster designer (d. 1979)
1912 – Chen Dayu, Chinese painter and calligrapher (d. 2001)
  1912   – John Curtis Gowan, American psychologist and academic (d. 1986)
  1912   – Monty Stratton, American baseball player and coach (d. 1982)
1913 – Gina Bachauer, Greek pianist and composer (d. 1976)
1914 – Romain Gary, French novelist, diplomat, film director, aviator (d. 1980)
1915 – Chakravarthi V. Narasimhan, Indian Civil Service Officer and former Under Secretary-General of the UN (d. 2003)
1916 – Dennis Day, American singer and actor (d. 1988)
  1916   – Tinus Osendarp, Dutch sprinter and police officer (d. 2002)
  1916   – Harold Robbins, American author and screenwriter (d. 1997)
1917 – Raymond Burr, Canadian-American actor and director (d. 1993)
1919 – George P. Mitchell, American businessman and philanthropist (d. 2013)
1920 – Bill Barber, American tuba player and educator (d. 2007)
  1920   – Forrest White, American businessman, co-founded the Music Man Company  (d. 1994)
1921 – Sandy Douglas, English computer scientist and academic, designed OXO (d. 2010)
  1921   – Andrei Sakharov, Russian physicist and academic, Nobel Prize laureate (d. 1989)
1923 – Vernon Biever, American photographer (d. 2010)
  1923   – Armand Borel, Swiss-American mathematician and academic (d. 2003)
  1923   – Ara Parseghian, American football player and coach (d. 2017)
  1923   – Dorothy Hewett, Australian feminist poet, novelist and playwright (d. 2002)
  1923   – Evelyn Ward, American actress (d. 2012)
1924 – Peggy Cass, American actress, comedian, and game show panelist (d. 1999)
1926 – Robert Creeley, American novelist, essayist, and poet (d. 2005)
1927 – Kay Kendall, English actress and comedian (d. 1959)
  1927   – Péter Zwack, Hungarian businessman and diplomat (d. 2012)
1928 – Tom Donahue, American radio host and producer (d. 1975)
  1928   – Alice Drummond, American actress (d. 2016)
1929 – Larance Marable, American drummer (d. 2012)
  1929   – Robert Welch, English silversmith and industrial designer (d. 2000)
1930 – Tommy Bryant, American bassist (d. 1982)
  1930   – Keith Davis, New Zealand rugby player (d. 2019)
  1930   – Malcolm Fraser, Australian politician, 22nd Prime Minister of Australia (d. 2015)
1932 – Inese Jaunzeme, Latvian javelin thrower and surgeon (d. 2011)
  1932   – Leonidas Vasilikopoulos, Greek admiral and intelligence chief (d. 2014)
1933 – Maurice André, French trumpet player (d. 2012)
  1933   – Yevgeny Minayev, Russian weightlifter (d. 1993)
1934 – Jocasta Innes, Chinese-English journalist and author (d. 2013)
  1934   – Bob Northern, American horn player and bandleader (d.2020)
  1934   – Bengt I. Samuelsson, Swedish biochemist and academic, Nobel Prize laureate
1935 – Terry Lightfoot, English clarinet player and bandleader (d. 2013)
1936 – Günter Blobel, Polish-American biologist and academic, Nobel Prize laureate (d. 2018)
1938 – Lee "Shot" Williams, American singer (d. 2011)
1939 – Heinz Holliger, Swiss oboist, composer, and conductor
1940 – Tony Sheridan, English singer-songwriter and guitarist (d. 2013) 
1941 – Martin Carthy, English singer-songwriter, guitarist, and producer 
  1941   – Bobby Cox, American baseball player and manager
  1941   – Ambrose Greenway, 4th Baron Greenway, English photographer and politician
  1941   – Ronald Isley, American singer-songwriter and producer
1942 – David Hunt, Baron Hunt of Wirral, English politician, Secretary of State for Wales
  1942   – John Konrads, Australian swimmer (d. 2021)
  1942   – Danny Ongais, American race car driver (d. 2022)
1943 – Vincent Crane, English pianist and composer (d. 1989)
  1943   – John Dalton, English bass player
  1943   – Hilton Valentine, English guitarist and songwriter (d. 2021)
1944 – Haleh Afshar, Baroness Afshar, Iranian-English academic and politician (d. 2022)
  1944   – Marcie Blane, American singer
  1944   – Janet Dailey, American author and entrepreneur (d. 2013)
  1944   – Mary Robinson, Irish lawyer and politician, President of Ireland
1945 – Ernst Messerschmid, German physicist and astronaut
  1945   – Richard Hatch, American actor, writer, and producer (d. 2017)
1946 – Allan McKeown, English-American screenwriter and producer (d. 2013)
  1946   – Wayne Roycroft, Australian equestrian rider and coach
1947 – Bill Champlin, American singer-songwriter, guitarist, and producer 
  1947   – Linda Laubenstein, American physician and academic (d. 1992)
  1947   – İlber Ortaylı, Turkish historian and academic
1948 – Elizabeth Buchan, English author and critic
  1948   – Joe Camilleri, Maltese-Australian singer-songwriter and saxophonist
  1948   – Jonathan Hyde, Australian-English actor
  1948   – Denis MacShane, Scottish journalist and politician, UK Minister of State for Europe
  1948   – Leo Sayer, English-Australian singer-songwriter and musician 
1949 – Andrew Neil, Scottish journalist and academic
  1949   – Denis O'Connor, British police officer
  1949   – Rosalind Plowright, English soprano 
1950 – Will Hutton, English economist and journalist
1951 – Al Franken, American actor, screenwriter, and politician
  1951   – Adrian Hardiman, Irish lawyer and judge (d. 2016)
1952 – Mr. T, American actor and wrestler
1953 – Nora Aunor, Filipino actress and recording artist
  1953   – Jim Devine, British politician
1954 – Marc Ribot, American guitarist and composer
1955 – Paul Barber, English field hockey player
  1955   – Stan Lynch, American drummer, songwriter, and producer 
1957 – James Bailey, American basketball player
  1957   – Nadine Dorries, English nurse and politician
  1957   – Judge Reinhold, American actor and producer
  1957   – Renée Soutendijk, Dutch actress
1958 – Christian Audigier, French fashion designer (d. 2015)
  1958   – Muffy Calder, Canadian-Scottish computer scientist and academic
  1958   – Michael Crick, English journalist and author
  1958   – Naeem Khan, Indian-American fashion designer
  1958   – Jefery Levy, American director, producer, and screenwriter
1959 – Nick Cassavetes, American actor, director, and screenwriter
  1959   – Abdulla Yameen, Maldivian politician, 6th President of the Maldives
1960 – Jeffrey Dahmer, American serial killer (d. 1994)
  1960   – Kent Hrbek, American baseball player and sportscaster
  1960   – Mohanlal, Indian actor
  1960   – Mark Ridgway, Australian cricketer 
  1960   – Vladimir Salnikov, Russian swimmer
1962 – David Crumb, American composer and educator
1963 – Richard Appel, American screenwriter and producer
  1963   – Patrick Grant, American musician and producer
  1963   – David Lonsdale, English actor
  1964   – Pete Sandoval, Salvadoran-American drummer
  1963   – Dave Specter, American guitarist
  1963   – Laurie Spina, Australian rugby league player and sportscaster
1964 – Danny Bailey, English footballer and coach
1966 – Lisa Edelstein, American actress and playwright
  1966   – Tatyana Ledovskaya, Belarusian hurdler
1967 – Chris Benoit, Canadian professional wrestler (d. 2007)
1968 – Ilmar Raag, Estonian director, producer, and screenwriter
  1968   – Matthias Ungemach, German-Australian rower
  1968   – Julie Vega, Filipino actress and singer (d. 1985)
1969 – Pierluigi Brivio, Italian footballer
  1969   – Georgiy Gongadze, Georgian-Ukrainian journalist and director (d. 2000)
  1969   – Masayo Kurata, Japanese voice actress and singer
  1969   – George LeMieux, American lawyer and politician
  1969   – Brian Statham, Rhodesian born English footballer and manager
1970 – Brigita Bukovec, Slovenian hurdler
  1970   – Dorsey Levens, American football player and sportscaster
  1970   – Pauline Menczer, Australian surfer
  1970   – Carl Veart, Australian footballer and coach
1972 – The Notorious B.I.G., American rapper (d. 1997)
1973 – Stewart Cink, American golfer
  1973   – Noel Fielding, English comedian, musician and television presenter
1974 – Brad Arthur, Australian rugby league coach
  1974   – Fairuza Balk, American actress
  1974   – Havoc, American rapper and producer 
1975 – Anthony Mundine, Australian rugby league player and boxer
1976 – Stuart Bingham, English snooker player
  1976   – Abderrahim Goumri, Moroccan runner (d. 2013)
  1976   – Deron Miller, American singer-songwriter and guitarist
1977 – Quinton Fortune, South African international footballer and coach
  1977   – Michael Fuß, German footballer
1978 – Max B, American rapper and songwriter
  1978   – Briana Banks, German-American porn actress and model
  1978   – Jamaal Magloire, Canadian basketball player and coach
1979 – Damián Ariel Álvarez, Argentinian-Mexican footballer
  1979   – Jamie Hepburn, Scottish politician, Minister for Sport, Health Improvement and Mental Health
  1979   – James Clancy Phelan, Australian author and academic
  1979   – Scott Smith, American mixed martial artist
  1979   – Sonja Vectomov, Czech musician/composer
1980 – Gotye, Belgian-Australian singer-songwriter 
1981 – Craig Anderson, American ice hockey player
  1981   – Edson Buddle, American soccer player
  1981   – Josh Hamilton, American baseball player
  1981   – Maximilian Mutzke, German singer-songwriter
  1981   – Anna Rogowska, Polish pole vaulter
1983 – Līga Dekmeijere, Latvian tennis player
  1983   – Deidson Araújo Maia, Brazilian footballer
1984 – Brandon Fields, American football player
  1984   – Sara Goller, German volleyball player
1985 – Mark Cavendish, Manx cyclist
  1985   – Alexander Dale Oen, Norwegian swimmer (d. 2012)
  1985   – Isa Guha, English cricketer and sportscaster
  1985   – Lucie Hradecká, Czech tennis player
  1985   – Kano, English rapper, producer, and actor
  1985   – Dušan Kuciak, Slovak footballer
  1985   – Heath L'Estrange, Australian rugby league player
  1985   – Andrew Miller, American baseball player
1986 – Mario Mandžukić, Croatian footballer
  1986   – Myra, American singer and actress
  1986   – Eder Sánchez, Mexican race walker
  1986   – Park Sojin, South Korean singer-songwriter and dancer
  1986   – Greg Stewart, Canadian ice hockey player
1987 – Beau Falloon, Australian rugby league player
1988 – Claire Cashmore, English Paralympic swimmer
  1988   – Park Gyu-ri, South Korean singer 
  1988   – Jonny Howson, English footballer
  1988   – Kaire Leibak, Estonian triple jumper
1989 – Emily Robins, New Zealand actress and singer
  1989   – Hal Robson-Kanu, Welsh footballer
1990 – Kierre Beckles, Barbadian athlete
  1990   – Rene Krhin, Slovenian footballer
1991 – Guilherme, Brazilian footballer
1992 – Hutch Dano, American actor
  1992   – Lisa Evans, Scottish footballer
  1992   – Philipp Grüneberg, German footballer
  1992   – Olivia Olson, American singer and actress
1993 – Grete Gaim, Estonian biathlete
  1993   – Luke Garbutt, English footballer
  1993   – Lynn Williams, American soccer player
1994 – Tom Daley, English diver
1995 – Diego Loyzaga, Filipino actor
1996 – Josh Allen, American football player
  1996   – Indy de Vroome, Dutch tennis player
  1996   – Karen Khachanov, Russian tennis player
1997 – Ivan De Santis, Italian footballer
  1997   – Sisca Folkertsma, Dutch footballer
  1997   – Viktoria Petryk, Ukrainian singer-songwriter
  1997   – Kevin Quinn, American actor and singer
  2002   – Elena Huelva, Spanish cancer activist and influencer (d. 2023)

Deaths

Pre-1600
 252 – Sun Quan, Chinese emperor of Eastern Wu (b. 182)
 954 – Feng Dao, Chinese prince and chancellor (b. 882)
 987 – Louis V, king of West Francia (b. c. 966)
1075 – Richeza of Poland, queen of Hungary (b. 1013)
1086 – Wang Anshi, Chinese statesman and poet (b. 1021)
1237 – Olaf the Black, Manx son of Godred II Olafsson
1254 – Conrad IV, king of Germany (b. 1228)
1416 – Anna of Celje, queen consort of Poland (b. 1386)
1471 – Henry VI, king of England (b. 1421)
1481 – Christian I, king of Denmark (b. 1426)
1512 – Pandolfo Petrucci, Italian ruler (b. 1452)
1524 – Thomas Howard, 2nd Duke of Norfolk, English soldier and politician, Lord High Treasurer (b. 1443)
1542 – Hernando de Soto, Spanish-American explorer (b. 1496)
1563 – Martynas Mažvydas, Lithuanian writer (b. 1510)

1601–1900
1607 – John Rainolds, English scholar and academic (b. 1549)
1617 – Luis Fajardo, Spanish admiral and nobleman (b.  1556)
1619 – Hieronymus Fabricius, Italian anatomist (b. 1537)
1639 – Tommaso Campanella, Italian astrologer, theologian, and poet (b. 1568)
1647 – Pieter Corneliszoon Hooft, Dutch poet and playwright (b. 1581)
1650 – James Graham, 1st Marquess of Montrose, Scottish general and politician (b. 1612)
1664 – Elizabeth Poole, English settler, founded Taunton, Massachusetts (b. 1588)
1670 – Niccolò Zucchi, Italian astronomer and physicist (b. 1586)
1686 – Otto von Guericke, German physicist and inventor of the Magdeburg Hemispheres (b. 1602)
1690 – John Eliot, English-American minister and missionary (b. 1604)
1719 – Pierre Poiret, French mystic and philosopher (b. 1646)
1724 – Robert Harley, 1st Earl of Oxford and Earl Mortimer, English politician, Chancellor of the Exchequer (b. 1661)
1742 – Lars Roberg, Swedish physician and academic (b. 1664)
1762 – Alexander Joseph Sulkowski, Polish and Saxon general (b. 1695)
1771 – Christopher Smart, English actor, playwright, and poet (b. 1722)
1786 – Carl Wilhelm Scheele, German-Swedish chemist and pharmacist (b. 1742)
1790 – Thomas Warton, English poet and critic (b. 1728)
1810 – Chevalier d'Eon, French diplomat and spy (b. 1728)
1829 – Sikandar Jah, 3rd Nizam (b. 1768)
1844 – Giuseppe Baini, Italian priest and composer (b. 1775)
1858 – José de la Riva Agüero, Peruvian soldier and politician, 1st President of Peru and 2nd President of North Peru (b. 1783)
1862 – John Drew, Irish-American actor and manager (b. 1827)
1879 – Arturo Prat, Chilean lawyer and commander (b. 1848)
1894 – Émile Henry, French anarchist (b. 1872)
  1894   – August Kundt, German physicist and academic (b. 1839)
1895 – Franz von Suppé, Austrian composer and conductor (b. 1819)

1901–present
1901 – Joseph Olivier, French rugby player (b. 1874)
1911 – Williamina Fleming, Scottish-American astronomer and academic (b. 1857)
1915 – Leonid Gobyato, Russian general and engineer (b. 1875)
1919 – Evgraf Fedorov, Russian mathematician, crystallographer, and mineralogist (b. 1853)
1920 – Venustiano Carranza, Mexican politician, 54th President of Mexico (b. 1859)
1925 – Hidesaburō Ueno, Japanese agriculturalist, guardian of Hachikō (b. 1871)
1926 – Ronald Firbank, English-Italian author (b. 1886)
1929 – Archibald Primrose, 5th Earl of Rosebery, English politician, Prime Minister of the United Kingdom (b. 1847)
1932 – Marcel Boulenger, French fencer and author (b. 1873)
1935 – Jane Addams, American activist and author, co-founded Hull House, Nobel Prize laureate (b. 1860)
  1935   – Hugo de Vries, Dutch botanist and geneticist (b. 1848)
1940 – Billy Minter, English footballer and manager (b. 1888)
1949 – Klaus Mann, German-American novelist, playwright, and critic (b. 1906)
1952 – John Garfield, American actor (b. 1913)
1956 – Harry Bensley, English businessman and adventurer (b. 1877)
1957 – Alexander Vertinsky, Ukrainian-Russian singer-songwriter, actor, and poet (b. 1889)
1964 – James Franck, German physicist and academic, Nobel Prize laureate (b. 1882)
1965 – Marguerite Bise, French chef (b. 1898)
  1965   – Geoffrey de Havilland, English pilot and engineer, designed the de Havilland Mosquito (b. 1882)
1968 – Doris Lloyd, English actress (b. 1896)
1970 – E. L. Grant Watson, English-Australian biologist and author (b. 1885)
1973 – Vaughn Monroe, American singer, trumpet player, bandleader, and actor (b. 1911)
  1973   – Ivan Konev, Soviet Marshal and general (b. 1897)
1981 – Raymond McCreesh, PIRA volunteer (b. 1957)
  1981   – Patsy O'Hara, INLA volunteer (b. 1957)
1983 – Kenneth Clark, English historian and author (b. 1903)
1984 – Ann Little, American actress (b. 1891)
1988 – Sammy Davis Sr., American actor and dancer (b. 1900)
1991 – Rajiv Gandhi, Indian politician, 6th Prime Minister of India (b. 1944)
1995 – Les Aspin, American captain and politician, 18th United States Secretary of Defense (b. 1938)
1996 – Paul Delph, American singer-songwriter and producer (b. 1957) 
  1996   – Lash LaRue, American actor and producer (b. 1917)
  1996   – Villem Raam, Estonian art historian, art critic and conservator (b. 1910)
1998 – Robert Gist, American actor and director (b. 1917)
2000 – Barbara Cartland, English author (b. 1901)
  2000   – John Gielgud, English actor (b. 1904)
  2000   – Mark R. Hughes, American businessman, founded Herbalife (b. 1956)
2002 – Niki de Saint Phalle, French-American sculptor and painter (b. 1930)
2003 – Alejandro de Tomaso, Argentinian-Italian race car driver and businessman, founded De Tomaso (b. 1928)
  2003   – Frank D. White, American captain, banker, and politician, 41st Governor of Arkansas (b. 1933)
2005 – Deborah Berger, American outsider artist (b. 1956)
  2005   – Stephen Elliott, American actor (b. 1918)
  2005   – Howard Morris, American actor and director (b. 1919)
2006 – Spencer Clark, American race car driver (b. 1987)
  2006   – Katherine Dunham, American dancer, choreographer, and author (b. 1909)
  2006   – Cherd Songsri, Thai director, producer, and screenwriter (b. 1931)
  2006   – Billy Walker, American singer-songwriter and guitarist (b. 1929)
2012 – Eddie Blazonczyk, American singer-songwriter (b. 1941)
  2012   – Otis Clark, American butler and preacher, survivor of the Tulsa race riot (b. 1903)
  2012   – Constantine of Irinoupolis, Metropolitan of Irinoupolis and Primate of the Ukrainian Orthodox Church of the USA (b. 1936)
  2012   – Roman Dumbadze, Georgian commander (b. 1964)
  2012   – Douglas Rodríguez, Cuban boxer (b. 1950)
  2012   – Bill Stewart, American football player and coach (b. 1952)
  2012   – Alan Thorne, Australian anthropologist and academic (b. 1939)
2013 – Count Christian of Rosenborg, member of the Danish royal family (b. 1942)
  2013   – Frank Comstock, American trombonist, composer, and conductor (b. 1922)
  2013   – Cot Deal, American baseball player and coach (b. 1923)
  2013   – Leonard Marsh, American businessman, co-founded Snapple (b. 1933)
  2013   – Bob Thompson, American pianist and composer (b. 1924)
  2013   – Dominique Venner, French journalist and historian (b. 1935)
2014 – Tunku Annuar, Malaysian son of Badlishah of Kedah (b. 1939)
  2014   – Johnny Gray, American baseball player (b. 1926)
  2014   – Jaime Lusinchi, Venezuelan physician and politician, President of Venezuela (b. 1924)
  2014   – Alireza Soleimani, Iranian wrestler (b. 1956)
2015 – Annarita Sidoti, Italian race walker (b. 1969)
  2015   – Twinkle, English singer-songwriter (b. 1948)
  2015   – Jassem Al-Kharafi, Kuwaiti businessman and politician, 8th Kuwaiti Speaker of the National Assembly (b. 1940)
  2015   – Fred Gladding, American baseball player and coach (b. 1936)
  2015   – Louis Johnson, American bass player and producer (b. 1955)
2016 – Nick Menza, American drummer and songwriter (b. 1964)
2019 – Rik Kuypers, Belgian film director (b. 1925)
  2019   – Binyavanga Wainaina, Kenyan writer (b. 1971)
2020 – Alan Merten, fifth President of George Mason University (b. 1941)

Holidays and observances
 Afro-Colombian Day (Colombia)
 Christian feast day:
 Arcangelo Tadini
 Blessed Adílio Daronch and Manuel Gómez González
 Blessed Franz Jägerstätter
 Earliest day on which Corpus Christi can fall, while June 24 is the latest; held on Thursday after Trinity Sunday (often locally moved to Sunday). (Roman Catholic Church)
 Emperor Constantine I
 Eugène de Mazenod
 Helena of Constantinople, also known as "Feast of the Holy Great Sovereigns Constantine and Helen, Equal-to-the-Apostles." (Eastern Orthodox Church, Anglican Communion)
 John Elliot (Episcopal Church)
 Saints of the Cristero War, including Christopher Magallanes
 May 21 (Eastern Orthodox liturgics)
 Circassian Day of Mourning (Circassians)
Day of Patriots and Military (Hungary)
 Independence Day, celebrates the Montenegrin independence referendum in 2006, celebrated until the next day. (Montenegro)
 International Tea Day (International)
 Navy Day (Chile)
 Saint Helena Day, celebrates the discovery of Saint Helena in 1502. (Saint Helena, Ascension and Tristan da Cunha)
 World Day for Cultural Diversity for Dialogue and Development (International)

References

External links

 BBC: On This Day
 
 Historical Events on May 21

Days of the year
May